Johan Hendrik Willem Rühl (May 9, 1885 in Amsterdam – December 4, 1972 in Hilversum) was a Dutch water polo player who competed in the 1908 Summer Olympics. He was the goalkeeper of the Dutch water polo team, which finished fourth in the 1908 tournament.

See also
 Netherlands men's Olympic water polo team records and statistics
 List of men's Olympic water polo tournament goalkeepers

References

External links
 

1885 births
1972 deaths
Dutch male water polo players
Water polo goalkeepers
Olympic water polo players of the Netherlands
Water polo players at the 1908 Summer Olympics
Water polo players from Amsterdam